Ernocornutia pululahuana is a species of moth of the family Tortricidae. It is found in Pichincha Province, Ecuador.

The wingspan is 18.5 mm. The ground colour of the forewings is cream mixed, strigulated (finely streaked) and dotted with brown. The ground colour is limited to the postmedian dirty ferruginous area. The hindwings are cream, tinged with brownish on the periphery.

References

Moths described in 2008
Euliini
Moths of South America
Taxa named by Józef Razowski